Richard Le Poer Trench, 2nd Earl of Clancarty, 1st Marquess of Heusden  (19 May 1767 – 24 November 1837), styled The Honourable from 1797 to 1803 and then Viscount Dunlo to 1805, was an Anglo-Irish peer, a nobleman in the Dutch nobility, and a diplomat. He was an Irish, and later British, Member of Parliament and a supporter of Pitt. Additionally he was appointed Postmaster General of Ireland, and later, of the United Kingdom.

Background and education
Clancarty was the son of William Trench, 1st Earl of Clancarty and Anne, daughter of Charles Gardiner and his seat was Garbally Court in Ballinasloe, East County Galway where he was associated with the Great October Fair. His brother was Power Le Poer Trench (1770–1839), archbishop of Tuam. He was educated at Kimbolton School and St John's College, Cambridge.

Political career
Trench represented Newtown Limavady in the Irish House of Commons from 1796 to 1798. He sat further for Galway County from 1798 to a short time before the Act of Union, when he was replaced by "Humanity Dick" Martin.

He was credited with resolving various border disputes in Holland, Germany and Italy at the Congress of Vienna, 1814–1815, and in his role as Ambassador to the Netherlands. For his service as ambassador to The Hague, he was awarded the hereditary title of Marquess of Heusden in the peerage of The Netherlands on 8 July 1815 by William I of the Netherlands, following the defeat of Napoleon in Brabant, in that same province's southern reaches. Trench was elected one of the 28 representative peers of Ireland on 16 December 1808. His seat in the House of Lords became hereditary when he was created Baron Trench (4 August 1815) and Viscount Clancarty (created 8 December 1823), in the Peerage of the United Kingdom, his older peerages being Irish peerages. He was a Commissioner for the Affairs of India and Custos Rotulorum of County Galway.

In the same Royal Decree that awarded the Marquessate of Heusden, K.B. of 8 July 1815, numbers 13 en 14, another Irishman, Arthur Wellesley was granted the Netherlands' Kingdom hereditary nobility-title Prince of Waterloo, following his recent exploits at Waterloo in modern-day Kingdom of Belgium.

Postmaster General
Between 1807 and 1809 Trench was one of the joint Postmasters General of Ireland and he was appointed Postmaster General of the United Kingdom being one of the last joint holders of that office from 1814 to 1816.

Family
On 6 February 1796 he married Henrietta Margaret Staples, daughter of John Staples and Harriet Conolly. They had the following children:

Lady Lucy Le Poer Trench (d. 1839), married Robert Maxwell
Lady Louisa Augusta Anne Le Poer Trench (b. 23 December 1796, d. 7 February 1881), married Reverend William Le Poer Trench
Lady Harriet Margaret Le Poer Trench (b. 13 October 1799, d. 1885), married Thomas Kavanagh "the MacMurrough", a descendant of Art mac Art MacMurrough-Kavanagh
Lady Emily Florinda Le Poer Trench (b. 7 November 1800), married Giovanni Cossiria
Lady Frances Power Le Poer Trench (b. 22 January 1802, d. 28 December 1804)
William Thomas Le Poer Trench, 3rd Earl of Clancarty (b 21 September 1803, d. 26 April 1872), married Lady Sarah Juliana Butler, daughter of Somerset Richard Butler, 3rd Earl of Carrick
Hon. Richard John Le Poer Trench (b. 1805)
Commander Hon. Frederick Robert Le Poer Trench (b. 23 July 1808, d. April 1867), married Catherine Maria Thompson

Ancestry

References

Urban, Sylvanus.  "The Earl of Clancarty." The Gentleman's Magazine. Obituary Vol. IX, January to June, London: William Pickering; John Bowyer Nickols and Son, 1838. (pp. 93–94) googlebooks Retrieved 17 October 2008
Lodge, Edmund. The Peerage of the British Empire As at Present Existing: Arranged and Printed from the Personal Communications of the Nobility, by Edmund Lodge, to Which Is Added a View of the Baronetage of the Three Kingdoms.  London: Saunders and Otley, 1834. (p. 96)  googlebooks Accessed 9 March 2008

External links
 

1767 births
1837 deaths
18th-century Irish politicians
19th-century Irish politicians
Alumni of St John's College, Cambridge
Diplomatic peers
Dutch nobility
Irish MPs 1790–1797
Irish MPs 1798–1800
Irish representative peers
Knights Grand Cross of the Order of the Bath
Marquess of Heusden
Masters of the Mint
Members of the Privy Council of the United Kingdom
Members of the Privy Council of Ireland
Members of the Parliament of the United Kingdom for English constituencies
Members of the Parliament of the United Kingdom for County Galway constituencies (1801–1922)
People from Ballinasloe
Politicians from County Galway
UK MPs 1801–1802
UK MPs 1802–1806
UK MPs 1806–1807
UK MPs 1807–1812
UK MPs who inherited peerages
UK MPs who were granted peerages
United Kingdom Postmasters General
Richard
Ambassadors of the United Kingdom to the Netherlands
Members of the Parliament of Ireland (pre-1801) for County Londonderry constituencies
Members of the Parliament of Ireland (pre-1801) for County Galway constituencies
Presidents of the Board of Trade
Earls of Clancarty
Peers of the United Kingdom created by George IV
T